Siti Nordiana Alias (born 22 November 1984) is a Malaysian singer, actress, songwriter and businesswoman. She started her music career at age of 15 and has released six studio albums to date. Her name rose again after joining the second season of Gegar Vaganza, winning the competition in 2015.

Career
Siti Nordiana started her music career at her younger age, her father is a responsible person who brought her to music scene. She signed to Malaysian record label, FMC Music and released debut album Gurindam Rindu Berkasih in 1999. Since then, she recorded four more albums until she left FMC Music permanently in 2012. In 2015, she released her first religious album, Anakku Sayang under Sony Music. She was part of the second season of Malaysian reality singing competition, Gegar Vaganza, winning the competition thus reviving her music career. Siti Nordiana also dabbles in acting career, having appeared in a telemovie Helah in 2003. She made a breakthrough role in the television series, Dia Semanis Honey (2016) where she paired with Alif Satar. She then set-up her own company, SND Soul Entertainment which also served as her management team. She wrote her first autobiography, Life Goes On which documented her life and career journey. Released in September 2018 by Mustread Sdn. Bhd., the book was well-received and won the Anugerah Buku Negara 2019 for Best Public Book (Autobiography).

Personal life
Nana was married with actor, Mohd Faizal Yusup on 29 April 2006. They have a son named Muhammad Rayyan Nakhaie who was born on 21 March 2008. However, their marriage did not last long when they divorced on 14 September 2009.

On 1 January 2011, Faizal has died due to a heart attack. Since then, Nana has been more comfortable with her status as a single mother and is fully focused on her only child. According to her, all the strength and enthusiasm to work is for her raising son.

She started wearing a hijab in end year of 2011. In July 2019, she underwent surgery on her eyes to treat short-sightedness.

Discography

Studio albums
 Gurindam Rindu Berkasih (1999)
 Luahan Hati Kekasih (2000)
 Bingkisan Kasih (2002)
 Pelangi (2004)
 Semakin Jelas (2011)
 Anakku Sayang (2015)
 Hasbi Rabbi (2021)

Compilation albums
 Firus (2001) - with Syura
 The Best of Siti Nordiana - Rintihan (2002)
 Cahaya Kekasih (2007)

Single Release
 Cinta Hanya Sandaran (1999)
 Bukan Mengungkit Tapi Membangkit (2000)
 Serikan Wajahmu (2002)
 Biar Seperti Bidadari (Deddy Dores Featuring Siti Nordiana - 2003)
 Jangan Pisahkan (Deddy Dores Featuring Siti Nordiana - 2003)
 Selamanya Cinta (2004)
 Tak Tahan (2011)
 Tak Ada Cinta Sepertimu (2014) with Alif Aziz
 Terus Mencintai (2017)
 Hatiku Milikmu (2018)
 Satukan Rasa (2018) - with Khai Bahar
 Kesalahan Terindah (2020)
 Angkara (2020)
 Cukup Derita Itu (2021) 
 Amaran (2021) - with Bunga
 Menyantun Kasih (2022)
 Cintaku Masih Berdiri (2022)

Filmography

Drama

Telemovie

Television

Bibliography

Philanthropy and endorsement
On 16 April 2018, Nana and actor, Shaheizy Sam were appointed as ambassadors for Japanese cultured milk products, Calpis to promote the fiber goodness in conjunction with 'Goodness, It's In Our Culture' campaign and to promote the goodness and joy found in all every Calpis drink.

On 19 February 2020, she appointed as an ambassador for the Ze 'Venir brand.

Awards and nominations

References

External links

1984 births
Living people
Malaysian people of Malay descent
Malaysian Muslims
People from Negeri Sembilan
21st-century Malaysian women singers
Malaysian songwriters
Malaysian actresses
Malaysian film actresses
Malaysian television actresses
Malaysian television presenters
Malaysian businesspeople
Malay-language singers